Ahmed Abdelaal (born 8 June 1989) is an Egyptian volleyball player. He competed in the men's tournament at the 2016 Summer Olympics.

References

External links

1989 births
Living people
Egyptian men's volleyball players
Olympic volleyball players of Egypt
Volleyball players at the 2016 Summer Olympics